Nagadesh is an ancient Newar city in Madhyapur Thimi Municipality in Bhaktapur District in the Bagmati Zone of central Nepal. In 2011 it had a population of approximately 6,900 with more than 1500 houses in it, according to the 2011 Nepal census. At the time of the 1991 Nepal census it had a population of 4,237 with 693 houses in it. Most people are engaged in farming.

Nagadesh is famous for Shree Sidhi Ganesh Jatra, लुँझ्या Sunko Jhyaal (Golden Window Of Nagadesh), Sileshwor Mahadev Bisantaki Tole Nagadesh, Nagadesh Mahakali Naach, Bhairav Naach, Manohara Ghat, Nagadesh sindur jatra, Pulu Kishi Pyaakha Naach, Nagadesh Buddha Bihar.

Festivals that are celebrated in Nagadesh. People of Nagadesh celebrates festivals each month starting from the new year to the Holi puni at the end of the year.

 Biska jatra (New year festival) Shree Sidhi Ganesh Rath Jatra
 Mother's Day (Mathathirtha Aunshi)
 Buddha purnima (Buddha purnima)
 Kumar Khasti (Sithi Nakha)
 Gathamaga charya
 Janai puni: Sileshwor Mahadev Bisantaki Tole Nagadesh Mela
 Sa: Paaru (Gai Jatra)
 Nagadesh Mahakali Naach, Bhairav Naach
 Father's day (Kushe Aushi)
 Yenha Punchi  (in Purnima (full moon) After Indra Jatra of Kathmandu)
 Dashain (Nawaratri)
 Tihar (Laxmi pooja, Mha puja, Kija puja,)
 Sakima punhi
 Dhanya purnima (Yomari purnima)
 Maghe sankranti (Ghya-chaku sankranti) (Makar Sankranti)
 Pulu Kishi Pyaakha Naach 
 Shree panchami
 Shiva ratri
 Holi (Holi purnima)

Populated places in Bhaktapur District